Books with anti-war themes have explicit anti-war messages or have been described as having significant anti-war themes or sentiments. Not all of these books have a direct connection to any particular anti-war movement. The list includes fiction and non-fiction, and books for children and younger readers.

Fiction 

 All Men Are Enemies – Richard Aldington
 A Soldier's Quartet - Colin Baldwin, 2021, Shawline Publishing ("A brilliant read..."), novel based on true events in WWI and 100 years later (see https://www.goodreads.com/book/show/59082674-a-soldier-s-quartet) 
 Beelzebub’s Tales to His Grandson – George I. Gurdjieff, 1949
 All Quiet on the Western Front – Erich Maria Remarque, 1928
 The Americanization of Emily – William Bradford Huie, 1964
 Ashe of Rings – Mary Butts novel, 1926
 Bid Me To Live – H.D. novel, 1960
 Captain Jinks, Hero – Ernest Crosby, 1902
 Catch-22 – Joseph Heller, 1961
 Cat's Cradle – Kurt Vonnegut science fiction novel
 Celestial Matters – Richard Garfinkle science fiction novel
 Company K – William March novel
 Dead Yesterday – Mary Agnes Hamilton novel, 1916
 Death Of A Hero – Richard Aldington
 Despised and Rejected – Rose Allatini novel (published under the name A. T. Fitzroy) 1918
 A Fable – William Faulkner, 1954, World War I
 The Empty Drum - Leo Tolstoy, 1887
 A Farewell to Arms – Ernest Hemingway, 1929
 For Whom the Bell Tolls – Ernest Hemingway, 1940
 The Forever War – Joe Haldeman science fiction novel
 From Here to Eternity – James Jones novel
 Generals Die in Bed – Charles Yale Harrison novel
 The Good Soldier Svejk – Jaroslav Hašek novel
 Involution & Evolution – Joss Sheldon novel
 Johnny Got His Gun – Dalton Trumbo novel, 1938
 Journey to the End of the Night – Louis-Ferdinand Céline novel
 Lay Down Your Arms! – Bertha von Suttner novel
 Looking Good – Keith Maillard novel
 Lyndon Johnson and the Majorettes – Keith Maillard novel
 Lysistrata – Aristophanes play, 411 BCE
 The Naked and the Dead – Norman Mailer novel
 Non-Combatants and Others – Rose Macaulay novel, 1916
 Not So Quiet: Stepdaughters of War – Evadne Price (as Helen Zenna Smith) novel, 1930
 On the Beach – Nevil Shute novel
 The Once and Future King – T. H. White, 1958
 Quiet Ways –  Katharine Burdekin novel, 1930 
 The Red Badge of Courage – Stephen Crane novel, 1895
 Regeneration – Pat Barker
 Shabdangal – Malayalam novel, 1947
 The Short-Timers – Gustav Hasford novel
 Slaughterhouse Five – Kurt Vonnegut science fiction novel
 The Sorrow of War – Bảo Ninh novel, 1990
 The Thin Red Line – James Jones novel, 1962
 The Things They Carried – Tim O'Brien, 1990
 Three Soldiers – John Dos Passos novel, 1921, World War I
 The Tin Drum – Günter Grass novel
 The Train Was on Time (Der Zug war pünktlich) – Heinrich Böll novel, 1949
 Two Women – Alberto Moravia novel, 1958
 Under Fire – Henri Barbusse novel, 1916
 The Unknown Soldier  – Väinö Linna novel, 1954
 Voyage to Faremido – Frigyes Karinthy novel, 1916
"War" - Ludwig Renn novel, 1928.
War Porn - Roy Scranton novel, 2016.
 "The War Prayer" – Mark Twain short story, c.1910
 War with the Newts – Karel Čapek, novel 1936
 The Wars – Timothy Findley novel, 1977
 We That Were Young – Irene Rathbone novel, 1932
 Why Are We in Vietnam? – Norman Mailer novel, 1967
 Why Was I Killed? (retitled Return of the Traveller in the US) – Rex Warner novel, 1943

Non-fiction 

 Addicted to War – Joel Andreas, 1991, 2002
Old man at the Bridge - Ernest Miller Hemmingway May 1938
 An American Ordeal: The Antiwar Movement of the Vietnam Era – Charles DeBenedetti, 1990
 The Armies of the Night – Norman Mailer non-fiction novel, 1968
 Autobiography:The Story of my Experiments with Truth – Mohandas K. Gandhi, 1927
 The Bloody Traffic – Fenner Brockway, 1934
 Born on the Fourth of July – Ron Kovic autobiography, 1976
 The Causes of World War Three – C. Wright Mills, 1958
 Choosing Peace:  A Handbook on War, Peace, and Your Conscience – Robert A. Seeley, 1994
 The Cold and the Dark: The World after Nuclear War – Paul R. Ehrlich, Carl Sagan and Donald Kennedy, 1984
 Collateral Damage: America's War Against Iraqi Civilians – Chris Hedges, 2008
 The Complaint of Peace – Desiderius Erasmus, 1517
 The Conduct of the Allies – Jonathan Swift, 1711
 The Conquest of Violence – Bart de Ligt, 1937
 Cry Havoc! – Beverley Nichols, 1933
 Disenchantment – C. E. Montague, 1922
 The Education of a Christian Prince – Desiderius Erasmus, 1516
 Einstein on Peace – edited by Otto Nathan and Heinz Norden; preface by Bertrand Russell, 1960
 Ends and Means – Aldous Huxley essays, 1937
 Fate of the Earth – Jonathan Schell, 1982
 The Gift of Time: The Case for Abolishing Nuclear Weapons Now – Jonathan Schell, 1998
 Good-Bye to All That - Robert Graves, 1929
 Hiroshima – John Hersey account of the bombings, 1946
 Human Smoke – Nicholson Baker
 If the War Goes On … – Hermann Hesse, 1971
 In Solitary Witness: The Life and Death of Franz Jägerstätter – Gordon C. Zahn, 1981
 The Killing Zone: My Life in the Vietnam War – Frederick Downs, 1978
 The Kingdom of God is Within You – Leo Tolstoy, 1894
 The Inevitable Revolution – Leo Tolstoy, 1909
 Krieg dem Kriege aka War Against War – Ernst Friedrich, 1924
 The Long Road to Greenham: Feminism and Anti-Militarism in Britain since 1820 – Jill Liddington, 1989
 Miami and the Siege of Chicago – Norman Mailer non-fiction novel, 1968
 New Cyneas – Émeric Crucé, 1623
 Newer Ideals of Peace – Jane Addams, 1907
 No Victory Parades: The Return of the Vietnam Veteran – Murray Polner, 1971
 Nonviolence: The history of a dangerous idea – Mark Kurlansky, 2006
 Nuclear Terrorism: The Ultimate Preventable Catastrophe – Graham Allison, 2004
 Nuclear Weapons: The Road to Zero – edited by Joseph Rotblat, 1998
 Pacifism in Europe to 1914, Peter Brock, 1972
 Pacifism in the Twentieth Century – Peter Brock and Nigel Young, 1999
 Pacifism in the United States – Peter Brock, 1968
 Peace Is Possible: Conversations with Arab and Israeli Leaders from 1988 to the Present – S. Daniel Abraham, Bill Clinton, 2006
 Peace Signs: The Anti-War Movement Illustrated – James Mann, editor, 2004
 Peace with Honour – A. A. Milne, 1934
 A People's History of the United States – Howard Zinn, 1980
 Perpetual Peace: A Philosophical Sketch – Immanuel Kant essay, 1795
 The Politics of Jesus – John Howard Yoder, 1972
 The Power of Non-Violence – Richard B. Gregg, 1934
 The Root Is Man: Two Essays in Politics – Dwight Macdonald, 1953
 Scapegoats of the Empire – Lt. George Witton memoir, 1907
 Science, Liberty and Peace – Aldous Huxley, 1946
 The Seventh Decade: The New Shape of Nuclear Danger – Jonathan Schell, 2007
 The Struggle Against the Bomb 1 - One World or None: a history of the world nuclear disarmament movement through 1953 – Lawrence S. Wittner, 1993
 The Struggle Against the Bomb 2 - Resisting the Bomb: a history of the world nuclear disarmament movement, 1954-1970 – Lawrence S. Wittner, 1997
 The Struggle Against the Bomb 3 - Toward Nuclear Abolition: a history of the world nuclear disarmament movement, 1971 to the present – Lawrence S. Wittner, 2003
 Testament of Youth – Vera Brittain, 1933
 The Third Morality – Gerald Heard, 1937
 Three Guineas – Virginia Woolf, 1938
 Conscience for Change, reprinted as The Trumpet of Conscience – (five transcribed lectures given by) Martin Luther King Jr., 1968
 Voices Against War: A Century of Protest – Lyn Smith, 2009
 War and Democracy – Paul Gottfried, 2012
 War Is a Force That Gives Us Meaning – Chris Hedges, 2003
 War Is a Lie – David Swanson, 2010
 War Is a Racket – former U.S. Marine Major General Smedley Butler speech, 1933 and pamphlet, 1935
 We Will Not Cease – Archibald Baxter memoir, 1939
 Which Way to Peace? – Bertrand Russell, 1936
 White Flash, Black Rain: Women of Japan Relive the Bomb – L. Vance-Watkins and A. Mariko, eds., 1995
 Why Didn't You Have To Go To Vietnam, Daddy? – Steve Wilken, Starving Writers Publishing, 2009
  Why Men Fight – Bertrand Russell, 1916
 Women, Power, and the Biology of Peace – Judith Hand, 2003 
 Worthy of Gratitude? Why Veterans May Not Want to be Thanked for Their Service in War – Camillo Mac Bica, Gnosis Press, 2015
 Writings Against Power and Death – Alex Comfort, 1994

Anthologies of anti-war writing 

 Instead of Violence: Writings by the Great Advocates of Peace and Nonviolence throughout History – edited by Arthur Weinberg and Lila Shaffer Weinberg, 1963
 The Pacifist Conscience – edited by Peter Mayer, 1966
 Peace is the Way: writings on nonviolence from the Fellowship of Reconciliation – edited by Walter Wink
 We Who Dared to Say No to War: American Antiwar Writing from 1812 to Now – Murray Polner, Thomas Woods, 2008

Juvenile fiction 

 The Butter Battle Book – Dr. Seuss, 1984
 Children of the Book – Peter Carter, 1982
 The Clay Marble – Minfong Ho novel, 1991
 Fallen Angels – Walter Dean Myers novel, 1988
 Habibi – Naomi Shihab Nye novel, 1997
 I Had Seen Castles – Cynthia Rylant, 1993
 Soldier's Heart: A Novel of the Civil War – Gary Paulsen novel, 1998
 Sunrise over Fallujah – Walter Dean Myers, 2008
 War Horse – Michael Morpurgo, 1982
 When the Horses Ride By: Children in the Times of War – Greenfield, Gilchrist poems and illus., 2006
 Glinda of Oz by L. Frank Baum (published posthumously), Reilly & Lee, 1920.

Juvenile non-fiction 

 Ain't Gonna Study War No More: The Story of America's Peace Seekers – Milton Meltzer, 2002
 Lines in the Sand: New Writing on War and Peace – Hoffman and Lassister, eds. essays, stories, poems, 2003
 A Little Peace – Barbara Kerley, 2007
 Operation Warhawks: How Young People Become Warriors – Terrence Webster-Doyle, 1993
 Paths to Peace: People Who Changed the World – Jane Breskin Zalben, 2004
 Peace One Day – Jeremy Gilley, 2005
 Some Reasons for War: How Families, Myths and Warfare Are Connected – Sue Mansfield, 1988

See also 
 List of peace activists
 List of anti-war songs
 List of anti-war plays
 List of anti-war films

Notes 

 
Bibliographies of wars and conflicts